Dedinka is a municipality and village in the Nové Zámky District in the Nitra Region of south-west Slovakia.

History
In historical records the village was first mentioned in 1227.

Geography
The village lies at an altitude of 180 metres above sea level and covers an area of 18.519 km². It has a population of about 830 people.

Ethnicity
The population is about 98% Slovak and 2% Hungarian.

Facilities
The village has a public library and football pitch.

Genealogical resources

The records for genealogical research are available at the state archive "Statny Archiv in Nitra, Slovakia"

 Roman Catholic church records (births/marriages/deaths): 1733-1895 (parish A)
 Lutheran church records (births/marriages/deaths): 1785-1896 (parish B)
 Reformated church records (births/marriages/deaths): 1784-1895 (parish B)

See also
 List of municipalities and towns in Slovakia

External links
https://web.archive.org/web/20070427022352/http://www.statistics.sk/mosmis/eng/run.html
Surnames of living people in Dedinka
Dedinka – Nové Zámky okolie

Villages and municipalities in Nové Zámky District